Summer and Smoke is a two-part, thirteen-scene play by Tennessee Williams, completed in 1948. He began working on the play in 1945 as Chart of Anatomy, derived from his short stories "Oriflamme" and the then-work-in-progress "Yellow Bird." The phrase "summer and smoke" probably comes from the Hart Crane poem "Emblems of Conduct" in the 1926 collection White Buildings. After a disappointing Broadway run in 1948, the play was a hit Off-Broadway in 1952. Williams continued to revise Summer and Smoke in the 1950s, and in 1964 he rewrote the play as The Eccentricities of a Nightingale.

Synopsis 
Summer and Smoke is set in Glorious Hill, Mississippi, from the "turn of the century through 1916", and centers on Alma Winemiller, a highly strung, unmarried minister's daughter, and the spiritual/sexual romance that nearly blossoms between her and John Buchanan Jr., a wild, undisciplined young doctor who grew up next door. She, ineffably refined, identifies with the Gothic cathedral, "reaching up to something beyond attainment"; her name, as Williams makes clear during the play, means "soul" in Spanish; whereas Buchanan, doctor and sensualist, defies her with the soulless anatomy chart.

By the play's end, however, Buchanan and Alma have traded places philosophically. She has been transformed beyond modesty. She throws herself at him, saying "now I have changed my mind, or the girl who said 'no', — she doesn't exist any more, she died last summer — suffocated in smoke from something on fire inside her." But he has changed, he is engaged to settle down with a respectable, younger girl, and as he tries to convince Alma that what they had between them was indeed a "spiritual bond", she realizes, in any event, that it is too late. In the final scene, Alma accosts a young traveling salesman at dusk in the town park, and as the curtain falls, she follows him to enjoy the "after-dark entertainment" at Moon Lake Casino, where she had resisted Buchanan's attempt to seduce her the previous summer.

Production history 
On 6 October 1948, after an opening run in Dallas, Texas, Summer and Smoke received its first Broadway performance at the Music Box Theatre in New York City in a production staged by Margo Jones and designed by Jo Mielziner with Tod Andrews, Margaret Phillips, Monica Boyar and Anne Jackson. The play ran for 102 performances, and at the time, represented a downturn in popularity for Williams following his successful A Streetcar Named Desire.

In 1952, Geraldine Page played the lead role in a revival directed by José Quintero at the newly founded Circle in the Square Theatre in downtown New York (the theater was in its earlier Sheridan Square Playhouse location). Her performance has been credited with helping to launch the Off-Broadway movement, putting both herself and Quintero on the map, and vindicating the play. Page starred in an hour-long adaptation of the play on the radio series Best Plays in 1953 opposite Richard Kiley (recordings of which still exist). She also portrayed Alma Winemiller in the 1961 film opposite Laurence Harvey, earning an Academy Award nomination (as did Una Merkel playing her mother). Additional Oscar nominations went to the Art Direction and Elmer Bernstein's evocative musical score.

The Broadway premiere of the revised version titled The Eccentricities of a Nightingale was staged in 1976. The production was directed by Edwin Sherin, with scenery by William Ritman, costumes by Theoni V. Aldredge, lighting by Marc B. Weiss and original music by Charles Gross. It was produced in conjunction with Marc W. Jacobs. The production stage manager was Henry Banister and press was by Seymour Krawitz, Patricia McLean Krawitz and Louise Ment. The show starred Betsy Palmer (Alma), Shepperd Strudwick (Rev. Winemiller), Grace Carney (Mrs. Winemiller), Nan Martin (Mrs. Buchanan), Peter Blaxill (Roger Doremus), Jen Jones (Mrs. Bassett), Patricia Guinan (Rosemary), W.P. Dremak (Vernon), Thomas Stechschulte (Traveling Salesman) and David Selby as Dr. Buchanan. The production ran for 24 performances at the Morosco Theatre.

In 1991, Gilles Gleizes translated in French, with Roberta Bailey, Summer and Smoke, and directed the play in France, Théâtre de Rungis et CDN de Limoges.

In 1996, the play was revived at the Criterion Center Stage Right in New York, in a production directed by David Warren, with Harry Hamlin and Mary McDonnell. Laila Robins and Amanda Plummer have been notable Almas in regional productions.

It was nearly 60 years before the London premiere of Summer and Smoke. It opened at the Apollo Theatre on 17 October 2006. The production, directed by Adrian Noble and starring Rosamund Pike and Chris Carmack, first opened at the Nottingham Playhouse in September and then transferred to London. It closed 10 weeks short of its planned 16-week run due to disappointing ticket sales.

In January 2007, the Paper Mill Playhouse in Millburn, New Jersey, presented a revival starring Amanda Plummer and Kevin Anderson, directed by Michael Wilson. In May 2008, the Off-Broadway group The Actors Company Theatre (TACT) presented a revival of the 1964 revision of the play, titled The Eccentricities of a Nightingale, which received a favorable notice from The New York Times.

In 2017, the Almeida Theatre announced a new production starring Patsy Ferran, directed by Rebecca Frecknall and designed by Tom Scutt. After a successful run and several five-star reviews, the production was transferred to the Duke of York's Theatre.

The play returned to Off-Broadway in Spring 2018. It was performed by the Classic Stage Company and directed by Jack Cummings III.

Adaptations 

In 1961, a film adaptation by Paramount Pictures was directed by Peter Glenville, and starred Laurence Harvey, Rita Moreno, and Geraldine Page reprising her role as Alma. A television version was produced in 1972, starring Lee Remick, David Hedison, and Barry Morse. Another production, titled Eccentricities of a Nightingale, starring Blythe Danner and Frank Langella, aired as an episode of the PBS program Great Performances in 1976.

An operatic treatment of the play exists as well, composed by Lee Hoiby. It was first produced by the Minnesota Opera in 1971 and came to New York City Opera the following year. It was seen at Manhattan School of Music Opera Theater in December, 2010, and most recently by Converse College Opera Theatre in January, 2018.

References

External links 

 
1953 Best Plays radio adaptation of play at Internet Archive

1948 plays
Broadway plays
Plays by Tennessee Williams
Plays set in Mississippi
Plays set in the 1900s
Plays set in the 1910s
American plays adapted into films
1972 television films
1972 films
Plays adapted into operas